This is a list of notable restaurants that specialize in hot dogs.

This list includes restaurants, fast food restaurants and hot dog stands that primarily serve hot dogs and related food items. A hot dog stand is a food business stand that sells hot dogs from an external counter on a public thoroughfare.

Hot dog restaurants

 
 

 

 
 
 
 

 
 

 

 

 

 
 
 
 
 
 

 
 
 
 
 
 Nick's Famous Coney Island, Portland, Oregon, U.S.
 
 
 
 
 
 
 
 
 
 
 

 
 
 
 
 Tony Packo's Cafe, "Hungarian Hot Dogs", Toledo Ohio

Gallery

See also

 Coney Island hot dog
 List of hot dogs
 List of casual dining restaurant chains
 List of fast food restaurants
 List of hamburger restaurants
 List of street foods
 Hot dog cart
 Hot dog day
 Hot dog variations
 Lists of restaurants
 Types of restaurant
 World's longest hot dog
 "Singing hot dog man", Charley Marcuse

References

External links
 
 

Hot dog restaurants
Hot dog